The Type 212A is a class of diesel-electric submarine developed by Howaldtswerke-Deutsche Werft AG (HDW) for the German Navy (German: U-Boot-Klasse 212 A), and the Italian Navy where it is known as the  Todaro class. It features diesel propulsion and an additional air-independent propulsion (AIP) system using Siemens proton exchange membrane (PEM) compressed hydrogen fuel cells. The submarines can operate at high speed on diesel power or switch to the AIP system for silent slow cruising, staying submerged for up to three weeks with little exhaust heat. The system is also said to be vibration-free and virtually undetectable.

The Type 212 is the first fuel cell propulsion system equipped submarine series.

Development
At the beginning of the 1990s the German Navy was seeking a replacement for the Type 206 submarines. Initial study started on a Type 209 improved design, with AIP capability, called Type 212.

The final programme started in 1994 as the two navies of Germany and Italy began working together to design a new conventional submarine, respectively to operate in the shallow and confined waters of the Baltic Sea and in the deeper waters of the Mediterranean Sea. The two different requirements were mixed into a common one and, because of significant updates to the design, the designation has been changed to Type 212A since then.

On 22 April 1996 a Memorandum of Understanding (MOU) gave the start to the cooperation for building four vessels for German Navy and four vessels for Italian Navy. Its main aim was the construction of identical boats and the start of a collaboration in logistic and life-cycle support for the two navies.

The German government placed an initial order of four Type 212A submarines in 1998. The German Submarine Consortium built them at the shipyards of HDW and Thyssen Nordseewerke GmbH (TNSW) of Emden. Different sections of the submarines were constructed at both sites at the same time and then half of them were shipped to the respective other yard so that both HDW and Thyssen Nordseewerke assembled two complete submarines each.

In the same year the Italian government placed an order of two U212A submarines built by Fincantieri for the Italian Navy (Marina Militare) at Muggiano shipyard, designated as the Todaro class.

The German Navy ordered two additional, improved submarines in 2006, to be delivered from 2012 on. They will be 1.2 meters longer to give additional space for a new reconnaissance mast.

On 21 April 2008 the Italian Navy ordered the optional second batch of submarine, in the same configuration of the original ones. Some upgrading should involve materials and components of commercial derivation, as well as the software package of the CMS. The intention is to keep the same configuration of the first series and reduce maintenance costs.

The export-oriented Type 214 submarine succeeds the Type 209 submarine and shares certain features with the Type 212A, such as the AIP fuel cell propulsion.

Poland announced in December 2013 they will not buy, but only lease, two U212-A's, on account of not meeting "requirements of tactical and technical equipment developed by the military, including in particular the propulsion system, missile weapons and rescue system".

On 22 December 2015 Admiral Giuseppe De Giorgi, Commander in Chief of the Italian Navy, announced plans to build another two U212A submarines. In December 2022, an amended contract was signed for production of a third NFS Submarine based on the design of the previous two submarines. The third Submarine (NFS 3) is planned to be delivered at the end of 2030, while a contract for the fourth boat is anticipated in 2023.

In October 2016, during the celebration of the commissioning of U36, the German Navy announced the intent to procure another batch of two U212A within the next decade.

Type 212CD

In February 2017, it was announced that the Royal Norwegian Navy will procure four submarines based on Type 212. Initial plans envisaged service entry between 2025 and 2028. However, the Norwegian 2020 Defence Plan later envisaged service entry "around 2030". This "CD" (Common Design) variant of the Type 212 will consist of six submarines, with the German Navy ordering two new boats alongside the four Norwegian vessels. In March 2021 it was indicated that an agreement had been reached between Norway and Germany to initiate the acquisition program, pending approval by the Bundestag. The contract for construction of the six boats was signed in July 2021 with delivery of the first boat to the Royal Norwegian Navy anticipated in 2029.

Design 
Partly owing to the "X" arrangement of the stern planes, the Type 212 is capable of operating in as little as 17 metres of water. This is a long-standing requirement for German submarine designs, enabling them to pass a strategic point in the Baltic Sea (the "Kadettrinne") submerged. This allows it to come much closer to shore than most contemporary submarines. This gives it an advantage in covert operations, as SCUBA-equipped commandos operating from the boat can surface close to the beach and execute their mission more quickly and with less effort.

A notable design feature is the prismatic hull cross-section and smoothly faired transitions from the hull to the sail, improving the boat's stealth characteristics. The ship and internal fixtures are constructed of nonmagnetic materials, significantly reducing the chances of it being detected by magnetometers or setting off magnetic naval mines.

Air-independent propulsion 

Although hydrogen–oxygen propulsion had been considered for submarines as early as World War I, the concept was not very successful until recently due to fire and explosion concerns. In the Type 212 this has been countered by storing the fuel and oxidizer in tanks outside the crew space, between the pressure hull and outer light hull. The gases are piped through the pressure hull to the fuel cells as needed to generate electricity, but at any given time there is only a very small amount of gas present in the crew space.

Weapons 

Currently, the Type 212A is capable of launching the fiber optic-guided DM2A4 Seehecht ("Seahake") heavyweight torpedoes, the WASS BlackShark torpedoes and short-range missiles from its six torpedo tubes, which use a water ram expulsion system. Future capability may include tube-launched cruise missiles.

The short-range IDAS missile (based on the IRIS-T missile), primarily intended for use against air threats as well as small or medium-sized sea- or near land targets, is currently being developed by Diehl BGT Defence to be fired from Type 212's torpedo tubes. IDAS is fiber-optic guided and has a range of approx. 20 km. Four missiles fit in one torpedo tube, stored in a magazine. First deliveries of IDAS for the German Navy were scheduled from 2014 on.

A 30mm auto-cannon called Muräne (moray) to support diver operations or to give warning shots is being considered, too. The cannon, probably a version of the RMK30 built by Rheinmetall, will be stored in a retractable mast and can be fired without the boat emerging. The mast will also be designed to contain three Aladin UAVs for reconnaissance missions. This mast is likely to be mounted on the second batch of Type 212 submarines for the German Navy.

Operations
In April 2006, the German Navy's U-32 sailed from the Baltic Sea to Rota, Spain in a journey lasting two weeks which covered  without surfacing or snorkelling.

The Italian Navy's S 526 Todaro was deployed, for over six months in 2008, to the United States for CONUS 2008 exercise with the United States Navy.

The Italian Navy's S 527 Scirè was deployed, for over five months in 2009, to the U.S. for CONUS 2009 exercise with the United States Navy.

The Italian Navy's S 526 Todaro, between 1 September 2012 and 13 February 2013, for the first time was deployed to the Gulf of Aden, Arabian Sea, Gulf of Oman and the Indian Ocean.

In 2013, while on the way to participate in naval exercises in U.S. waters, the German Navy's U-32 established a new record for non-nuclear submarines with 18 days in submerged transit without snorkelling.

On 15 October 2017, the German Navy's U-35 suffered damage to its rudder fins while conducting dives off the Norwegian coast.

List of boats 

Italics indicate estimated date

General characteristics 

 Displacement: 1,450 tonnes surfaced, 1,830 tonnes submerged 2,500 tonnes surfaced for 212CD
 Length: 56 m (183.7 ft), 57.2 m (187.66 ft) (2nd batch) 73 m for 212CD
 Beam: 7 m (22.96 ft) 10 m for 212CD
 Draft: 6 m (19.68 ft) 7 m for 212CD
 Propulsion:
 1 MTU 16V 396 diesel-engine
 9 HDW/Siemens PEM fuel cells, 30–40 kW each (U31)
 2 HDW/Siemens PEM fuel cells 120 kW (U32, U33, U34)
 1 Siemens Permasyn electric motor 1700 kW, driving a single seven-bladed skewback propeller
 Speed: 20 knots (37 km/h) submerged, 12 knots surfaced
 Depth: over 
 Range:
 8,000 nautical miles (14,800 km, or 9,196 miles) at 8 knots (15 km/h)
 Endurance: 3 weeks without snorkeling, 12 weeks overall
 Armament:
 6 x 533 mm torpedo tubes (in 2 forward-pointing asymmetric groups of left 4 + right 2 ) with 13 torpedoes or 24 tube mines
 IDAS missiles
 24 external naval mines (optional)
 Countermeasures:
 Torpedo defence system Tau, 4 launchers, 40 jammers/decoys
 Sensors:
 STN Atlas DBQS40 sonar suite:
 TAS-3 passive low-frequency towed array sonar (deployed from sail)
 FAS-3 passive low-, and medium-frequency hull-mounted flank array sonar
 MOA 3070 mine detection sonar
 Periscopes:
 Carl Zeiss SERO 14, with FLIR and optical rangefinder
 Carl Zeiss SERO 15, with laser rangefinder
 Riva Calzoni periscope masts and snorkeling systems
 Kelvin Hughes Type 1007 I band navigation radar
 EADS FL 1800U ESM suite
 WASS hydrophones
 Avio GAUDI autopilot and hydraulic systems
 Kongsberg MSI-91 combat system
 Crew complement: 23–27 (incl. 5 officers)

See also
List of submarine classes in service
List of active German Navy ships
List of active Italian Navy ships

Submarines of similar comparison
 Type 214 submarine - A class of export-oriented diesel-electric attack-submarines, also developed by ThyssenKrupp Marine Systems and currently operated by the Hellenic Navy, the Portuguese Navy, the Republic of Korea Navy and the Turkish Naval Forces.
 Type 218SG submarine - A class of extensively-customised diesel-electric attack-submarines developed ThyssenKrupp Marine Systems and currently operated by the Republic of Singapore Navy.
  - A class of extensively-customised diesel-electric attack-submarines developed by ThyssenKrupp Marine Systems and currently operated by Israel.
  - A unique class of  diesel-electric attack-submarines developed by ThyssenKrupp Marine Systems and currently being built for Israel.
  - A class of export-oriented diesel-electric attack-submarines, jointly developed by Naval Group and Navantia and currently operated by the Chilean Navy, the Royal Malaysian Navy, the Indian Navy and the Brazilian Navy.
 S-80 Plus submarine - A class of conventionally-powered attack-submarines, currently being built by Navantia for the Spanish Navy.
 Blekinge-class submarine is a class of submarine developed by Kockums for the Swedish Navy
 KSS-III submarine - A class of diesel-electric attack submarines, built by Daewoo Shipbuilding & Marine Engineering and Hyundai Heavy Industries and operated by the Republic of Korea Navy.
  - A class of diesel-electric attack-submarines, built by Mitsubishi Heavy Industries for the Japan Maritime Self-Defense Force.
  - A class of diesel-electric attack submarines currently being built by Mitsubishi Heavy Industries and Kawasaki Heavy Industries for the Japan Maritime Self-Defense Force
 Type 039A submarine - A class of diesel-electric attack-submarines operated by the People's Liberation Army Navy (China) and being built for the navies of the Royal Thai Navy and the Pakistan Navy.
  - A class of diesel-electric attack-submarines being built for the Russian Navy.

References

Bibliography

External links 

German Bundeswehr official Type 212A web page
naval-technology.com — U212/U214 Attack Submarines, Germany
German Type 212A deal bolsters submarine force Jane's Navy International, 28 September 2006
Todaro (S 526) Marina Militare website

 *
Attack submarines